The 2014 Delray Beach International Tennis Championships is a professional tennis tournament played on hard courts. It is the 22nd edition of the tournament, and was part of the World Tour 250 series of the 2014 ATP World Tour. It took place in Delray Beach, Florida in the United States between February 17 and February 23, 2013. Seventh-seeded Marin Čilić won the singles title.

Singles main-draw entrants

Seeds

 Rankings are as of February 10, 2014.

Other entrants
The following players received wildcards into the singles main draw:
  Marcos Baghdatis
  Ryan Harrison
  Jack Sock

The following players received entry from the qualifying draw:
  Gastão Elias
  Steve Johnson
  Wayne Odesnik
  Rhyne Williams

The following player received entry as a lucky loser:
  Samuel Groth

Withdrawals
Before the tournament
  Brian Baker
  Vasek Pospisil (back injury)
  Janko Tipsarević

Retirements
  Alejandro Falla (back injury)
  Ivo Karlović (stomach virus)
  Lu Yen-hsun (neck injury)
  Kei Nishikori (left hip injury)
  Lleyton Hewitt (shoulder injury)

Doubles main-draw entrants

Seeds

 Rankings are as of February 10, 2014.

Other entrants
The following pairs received wildcards into the doubles main draw:
  Ryan Harrison /  Jack Sock
  Adrian Mannarino /  Michael Russell
The following pair received entry as alternates:
  Sekou Bangoura /  Vahid Mirzadeh

Withdrawals
Before the tournament
  Lu Yen-hsun (neck injury)
During the tournament
  Benjamin Becker (shoulder injury)
  Tomasz Bednarek (stomach virus)

Finals

Singles

  Marin Čilić defeated  Kevin Anderson, 7–6(8–6), 6–7(7–9), 6–4

Doubles

  Bob Bryan /  Mike Bryan defeated  František Čermák /  Mikhail Elgin, 6–2, 6–3

References

External links
Official website

Delray Beach International Tennis Championships
 
Delray Beach International Tennis Championships
Delray Beach International Tennis Championships
Delray Beach International Tennis Championships
Delray Beach Open